Jiaoliudao is a subdistrict of Wafangdian city, Liaoning, China, it is located on the Bohai Bay in the southwest of the city. Jiaoliudao is surrounded by the sea, and has an industry of well-developed seawater aquaculture. The place is one of seafood breeding bases in Dalian or Liaoning, and it was honoured as the "famous producing area of clams" in China.

Jiaoliudao was originally a township. On May 24, 2007, it was entrusted to govern by the management committee of Changxing Island Economic and Technological Development Zone. On January 2, 2008, the township was changed to a subdistrict, which is the other type of township-level division.

See also 
 List of township-level divisions of Liaoning

References 

Wafangdian
Township-level divisions of Liaoning
Subdistricts of the People's Republic of China